The Wales national team represents the country of Wales in international association football.

All players who have played in 10 or more matches, either as a member of the starting eleven or as a substitute, are listed below. Each player's details include his playing position while with the team, the number of caps earned and goals scored in all international matches, and details of the first and most recent matches played in. The names are initially ordered by number of caps (in descending order), then by date of debut, then by alphabetical order.

Key

Players

References 

Women's football in Wales